Bochenski may refer to:

In people:
 Brandon Bochenski (1982–), ice hockey player 
 Józef Maria Bocheński (1902–1995), Polish philosopher and logician 

In places:
 Bochnia County, (Polish: powiat bocheński), Poland